Tara Parker-Pope is an American author of general-audience books on health and personal wellness. In April, 2022, she joined the Washington Post as editor of the newly formed wellness department.Parker-Pope was previously at the New York Times where she was a columnist and author of the "Well" blog. Earlier, Parker-Pope wrote for the Wall Street Journal and the Houston Chronicle.

 Work 

Parker-Pope's books include Cigarettes: Anatomy of an Industry from Seed to Smoke (2001), HRT: Everything You Need to Know to Untangle the Controversy, Understand your Options and Make Your Own Choices (2007), and For Better: How the Surprising Science of Happy Couples Can Help Your Marriage Succeed (2010).

Her writing style is to mix personal observation with discussions of scientific research. For some, this style is appealing, as when Anne Colby writes in an online blog of the Los Angeles Times, "One of the perks of being a journalist is that it can give professional license to explore subjects of personal interest and to knock on doors closed to most people -- all in the course of doing your job. Author Tara Parker-Pope has made the most of that opportunity with her excellent new book." For others, this approach yields "relationship advice [which] is familiar and commonsensical," even as "married couples will still benefit from this refresher course."

 Personal life 
Parker-Pope was born in Arizona, and has lived in Japan, Taiwan, Texas and Ohio. She has a college-age daughter and lives in Manhattan’s Upper West Side, with her aging pets — Sunshine (cat) and Maddie (dog).

 Selected works 
 Tara Parker-Pope. Cigarettes: Anatomy of an Industry from Seed to Smoke. New York: The New Press. 2001. 
 Tara Parker-Pope. For Better (For Worse): The Science of a Good Marriage: Lessons from the Love Lab. Vermilion, 2010. 
 Tara Parker-Pope. HRT: Everything you need to know to ... Untangle the controversy, understand your option and make your own choices. Rodale, 2007. 
 Tara Parker-Pope. The Hormone Decision.'' Pocket Books, 2008.

References 

Living people
Year of birth missing (living people)
American columnists
The New York Times columnists
American women columnists
American health and wellness writers
American women non-fiction writers
21st-century American women